Park Sea-kyun (born 1 June 1971) is a South Korean Paralympian shooter. He won two gold medals at the 2012 Summer Paralympics, in the Men's 10 metre air pistol SH1 and the Mixed 50 metre pistol SH1. He is the current Paralympic champion.

References

1971 births
Living people
South Korean male sport shooters
Paralympic shooters of South Korea
Paralympic gold medalists for South Korea
Paralympic medalists in shooting
Shooters at the 2008 Summer Paralympics
Shooters at the 2012 Summer Paralympics
Medalists at the 2008 Summer Paralympics
Medalists at the 2012 Summer Paralympics
Place of birth missing (living people)
20th-century South Korean people
21st-century South Korean people